The Libertarian Party, formerly known as the Individual Freedom Party (P-LIB) is a Spanish political party founded in 2009.

The party statutes declare classical liberalism, the Austrian School of economics and Ayn Rand's Objectivism as its main influences. In the quest to renew and modernize classical liberalism, the party welcomes many libertarian, anarcho-capitalist and non-interventionist ideas. Two specific internal caucuses are officially recognized, the Objectivist one and the Radical Caucus one which is radical libertarian/anarcho-capitalist. However, most party members are not included in any of these caucuses and just adhere to the party's main principles and platform.

Currently led by Daniel Martinez, the first congress of the party took place on 25 September 2010 in Madrid and the second congress on 23 June 2012. The P-LIB first ran in the 2011 general elections in the electoral districts of Madrid and Zaragoza, obtaining about seven thousand votes to the Senate and over two thousand (0.01%) to the Congress.

Electoral Performance

Cortes Generales

References

External links 
 Official website (in Spanish)

Libertarian parties